David Lubega Balemezi (born 13 April 1975), better known by his stage name Lou Bega, is a German singer. His 1999 song "Mambo No. 5", a remake of Pérez Prado's 1949 instrumental piece, reached number 1 in many European countries and was nominated for a Grammy Award. Bega added his own words to the song and sampled the original version extensively. Bega's musical signature consists of combining musical elements of the 1940s and 1950s with modern beats and grooves.

Personal life
Bega was born on 13 April 1975 in Munich, Bavaria to a Sicilian mother and a Ugandan father. His father Charles went to West Germany in 1972 to study biology at the Ludwig Maximilian University of Munich. Until age six, Bega spent most of his time with his mother Nicole in Italy. Then they lived permanently in Munich, where Bega attended German primary school. As a teenager, he traveled to Miami, Florida, where he found the inspiration for his hit single "Mambo No. 5". Bega also lived in Uganda for six months.

Career
Bega started his musical career as a rapper. At the age of 13, he founded a hip hop group with two other boys. It would be two years before Bega and his friends' first CD would be released in 1990. While living in Miami, he discovered Latin music. After returning to Munich, Bega met his then manager, Goar Biesenkamp, as well as music producers "Frank Lio" (Achim Kleist) and "Donald Fact" (Wolfgang von Webenau) (Syndicate Musicproduction), with whom he developed the concept for the song "Mambo No. 5". Bega signed a recording contract to the label Lautstark.

His first single "Mambo No. 5" became a world wide hit in 1999, charting at No. 1 in most European countries, including Germany, UK, France, and No. 3 in the United States. In France, "Mambo No. 5" spent twenty weeks at No. 1. It was also used by the British television broadcaster Channel 4 for their coverage of test match cricket between 1999 and 2005.

On 19 July 1999, Bega released his debut album A Little Bit of Mambo, which peaked at No. 3 both in Bega's native Germany and the U.S. While it charted moderately in the UK, peaking at only No. 50, it reached No. 1 in Austria, Canada, Finland, Hungary, and Switzerland. The second single, "I Got a Girl" charted well, entering the Top 10 in some European countries, including France, Finland and Belgium. The third single, "Tricky, Tricky", achieved No. 18 on the Canadian charts and No. 74 on the U.S. Billboard charts. In France, Bega did well also with his single "Mambo Mambo", which reached No. 11 on the French charts.

Bega's second studio album Ladies and Gentlemen was released on 28 May 2001. The album failed to experience success similar to its predecessor in Bega's native market or internationally. It peaked at No. 54 in Germany, and No. 23 on Switzerland's album chart. The album produced two singles, "Just a Gigolo" and "Gentleman", both of which charted moderately.

Bega released his third studio album Lounatic on 10 May 2005, which failed to enter the charts.

On 21 May 2010, Bega released his fourth album titled Free Again, which also did not find much success on the charts. It only charted in Switzerland peaking at No. 78.

Bega's fifth studio album A Little Bit of 80's was released on 28 June 2013, in Germany on Ariola (Sony Music). In this album, Bega again covered classic international hits including "Smooth Operator" (1984)" by Sade, "I'm So Excited" (1982) by The Pointer Sisters, "Vamos a la playa" (1983) by Righeira, "Red Red Wine" (1968) by Neil Diamond and "Karma Chameleon" (1983) by Culture Club. Bega's first single off his fifth album, however, was "Give It Up" which was released in Germany on 14 June 2013. The song peaked at No. 6 in Germany.

In 2019, Bega released "Scatman & Hatman", his first release since 2013. The track uses vocal samples from the 1994 single "Scatman (Ski-Ba-Bop-Ba-Dop-Bop)" by Scatman John. Shortly after the track's release, he told Jason Lipshutz of Billboard that he was inspired to create the track by the fact that Scatman John died in the same year that "Mambo No. 5" was released, adding,

Collaborations
In 2006, Bega recorded a song titled "C'est la Vie" with Edvin Marton and a music video was also filmed. The song has only appeared on Marton's album Stradivarius as a bonus track and was never featured on any of Bega's albums.

Live performances

Bega has appeared on stage for royals as well as international corporations. Bega was on The Tonight Show with Jay Leno, Ally McBeal, MAD TV, The Martin Short Show, Motown Live, Jenny Jones, Queen Latifah, Access Hollywood, and others. Bega was also the only artist to be asked to sing the same song twice on Germany's headlining show Wetten, dass..?. On New Year's Eve 2007, he performed in Poland. He has been the MC at the American Music Awards, the Grammy Awards, the Billboard Radio Awards and at the Love Parade in Berlin. He also performed live on television on the Ant and Dec's Saturday Night Takeaway in the United Kingdom on 4 April 2015.
In July 2016, Bega performed as a special guest in several of André Rieu's famous Maastricht concerts. In December 2021, he performed "Mambo No. 5" at a Polish military base during a show for the support of Polish troops deployed against refugees at the Polish-Belarusian border, thanking them for "defending our border".

Appearances in other media
Bega sang the theme song for the Disney Channel animated series Brandy & Mr. Whiskers. Bega also recorded and starred in a music video of a Disney version of "Mambo No. 5" that featured Disney-themed lyrics.

In the video game Tropico, Bega is one of the characters that the player can choose as their dictatorial persona. He was included as part of a licensing deal that also saw Bega's song "Club Elitaire" integrated into the German release of Tropico. Also, in the Ubi Soft/Disney Interactive video game Walt Disney's The Jungle Book Rhythm n' Groove, Bega participates in a challenge with his namesake. The player dances as King Louie, attempting to dance to Bega's rendition of "I Wanna Be Like You". Doing so will unlock a video of him with children dancing to the aforementioned song. Bega also wrote the theme song for the French cartoon series Marsupilami.

Awards and nominations
{| class="wikitable sortable plainrowheaders" 
|-
! scope="col" | Award
! scope="col" | Year
! scope="col" | Nominee(s)
! scope="col" | Category
! scope="col" | Result
! scope="col" class="unsortable"| 
|-
!scope="row" rowspan=2|World Music Awards
| rowspan=2|2001
| rowspan=2|Himself
| World's Best Selling New Male Artist
| 
| rowspan=2|
|-
| World's Best Selling German Artist
|

Discography

Studio albums
 A Little Bit of Mambo (1999)
 Ladies and Gentlemen (2001)
 Lounatic (2005)
 Free Again (2010)
 A Little Bit of 80s (2013)
 90s Cruiser (2021)

References

External links
 
 

1975 births
21st-century German male singers
English-language singers from Germany
Hip hop singers
German people of Italian descent
German people of Sicilian descent
German people of Ugandan descent
Latin pop singers
Living people
Mambo musicians
Musicians from Munich